HealthWatch is a UK charity which promotes evidence-based medicine. Its formal aims are:
  The assessment and testing of treatments, whether “orthodox” or “alternative”;
 Consumer protection of all forms of health care, both by thorough testing of all products and procedures, and better regulation of all practitioners;
 Better understanding by the public and the media that valid clinical trials are the best way of ensuring protection.

Details
HealthWatch's President is Nick Ross and its patrons include Lord Dick Taverne, Steve Jones, Margaret McCartney, Sir Michael Rawlins and the comedian Robin Ince.

HealthWatch has a small international membership. It promotes evidence-based medicine. It publishes the quarterly HealthWatch Newsletter and occasional "position papers" on controversial medical treatments.

It was inspired by the oncologist Michael Baum, among others, and began as the Campaign Against Health Fraud mostly targeting unfounded claims by proponents of alternative medicine and downright quackery, but soon broadened to audit all forms of medical practice, and many of its members are more concerned about unproven orthodox therapies than complementary ones. Nonetheless it still sometimes attracts criticism from some believers in alternative medicine who claim that scientific approaches cannot be applied to their way of working. HealthWatch maintains it has no commercial sponsors of any form and relies on membership fees and donations from other charities.

References

External links

Health charities in the United Kingdom
Skeptic organisations in the United Kingdom
British medical websites
1991 establishments in the United Kingdom